The 1917 Holy Cross football team was an American football team that represented the College of the Holy Cross in the 1917 college football season.

In its fourth and final year under head coach Luke J. Kelly, the team compiled a 3–4 record. Raymond Lynch was the team captain for the second consecutive year.

Holy Cross played its home games at Fitton Field on the college campus in Worcester, Massachusetts.

Schedule

References

Holy Cross
Holy Cross Crusaders football seasons
Holy Cross football